Carlos Nazareno Hofmeister (born 15 September 1909, date of death unknown) was an Argentine sprinter. He competed in the men's 200 metres at the 1936 Summer Olympics.

References

1909 births
Year of death missing
Athletes (track and field) at the 1936 Summer Olympics
Argentine male sprinters
Olympic athletes of Argentina
Athletes from Buenos Aires
20th-century Argentine people